"All 4 Love" is a song by American music group Color Me Badd. In the United Kingdom, it was released in July 1991 as the second single from   their debut album, C.M.B. (1991), while in the United States, it was released as the album's third single in November of the same year. The recording contains elements from the 1966 song "Patch My Heart" by the Mad Lads.

On the US Billboard Hot 100, the song reached number one on January 25, 1992, ending the seven-week reign of Michael Jackson's "Black or White"; it was the band's second and final number-one single in the US. The song also reached number one in New Zealand and became a top-10 hit in several other countries.

Track listings
Single
 "All 4 Love" (album version) – 3:30
 "Color Me Badd" – 4:05

Maxi-CD
 "All 4 Love" (album mix) – 3:29
 "All 4 Love" (All 4 Street Mix with rap) – 3:47
 "All 4 Love" (Red Hot Mix) – 3:48
 "All 4 Love" (All 4 Street Mix without rap) – 3:47

Charts

Weekly charts

Year-end charts

Decade-end charts

Certifications

Release history

See also
 List of number-one singles in 1991 (NZ)
 Hot 100 number-one hits of 1992 (United States)

References

1991 singles
1991 songs
1992 singles
Billboard Hot 100 number-one singles
Color Me Badd songs
Giant Records (Warner) singles
Number-one singles in New Zealand
Songs written by Isaac Hayes
Songs written by Sam Watters
Songs written by Steve Cropper